Otto Albert Jacobs (April 19, 1889 – November 19, 1955) was a catcher in Major League Baseball. He played for the Chicago White Sox in 1918.

Biography
Jacobs was born in Chicago, Illinois, and started his professional baseball career in 1910. He spent the next few years in the Illinois–Indiana–Iowa League. In 1915, he joined the Rockford Wakes and had his best season, batting .302 and leading the league in home runs (7) and slugging percentage (.449).

In 1918, with the Chicago White Sox roster depleted due to World War I, Jacobs joined the team as a backup catcher. He played in 29 games and batted .205. Later that year, he played with a semi-pro team called the Joliet Standards.

Jacobs died in 1955, at the age of 66.

References

External links

1889 births
1955 deaths
Major League Baseball catchers
Chicago White Sox players
Peoria Distillers players
Springfield Senators players
Springfield Watchmakers players
Dayton Veterans players
Baseball players from Chicago